Traian Cogut (born 7 May 1948) is a Romanian former sports shooter. He competed in the 50 metre rifle, prone event at the 1964 Summer Olympics.

References

External links
 

1948 births
Living people
Romanian male sport shooters
Olympic shooters of Romania
Shooters at the 1964 Summer Olympics
Sportspeople from Iași